Lukhtonovo is a rural locality (a village) in Lavrovskoye Rural Settlement, Sudogodsky District, Vladimir Oblast, Russia. The population was 171 as of 2010. There are 4 streets.

Geography 
Lukhtonovo is located on the Sudogda River, 11 km north of Sudogda (the district's administrative centre) by road. Bykovo is the nearest rural locality.

References 

Rural localities in Sudogodsky District